Leshan Antione Lewis, better known as L.E.S., is a hip hop producer commonly associated with Nas and grew up with Nas in the Queensbridge housing project. His first production credit was for Nas' popular song "Life's a Bitch" from the Illmatic album in 1994. He soon produced a single, "Sugar Hill", for AZ's album Doe Or Die. In the next two years, he produced more songs for Nas as well as songs for Fat Joe, Shyheim, LL Cool J, Royal Flush and The Firm. In 1998, he started working with Poke & Tone and collaboratively produced Will Smith's #1 hit single "Gettin' Jiggy Wit It". From 1998 to 2005, he produced more songs for Nas, Big Punisher, N.O.R.E., Nature, Flipmode Squad, Kool Savas, Azad and others.

Most recently, he produced three tracks for Nas's album Hip Hop Is Dead, including "Black Republican," which features a verse from Nas' former rival Jay-Z. He also produced a track called "Girl" by rapper Cormega, which was included on his 2009 album Born and Raised.
(2016 Artis LOX song title,[[what happens] 
https://tidal.com/track/63157959

He also opened a recording studio named 45th streets studio in the Tidewater area of Virginia. https://www.45thstreetstudios.com/
https://instagram.com/dj_les?igshid=YmMyMTA2M2Y=

Notable productions
"Life's a Bitch" – off Illmatic (featuring Nas & AZ)
"Sugar Hill" – off Doe or Die (featuring AZ & Miss Jones)
"Shaolin Style" – off The Lost Generation (featuring Shyheim)
"Envy" – off Jealous One's Envy (featuring Fat Joe)
"Glamour Life" – off Capital Punishment (featuring Big Pun)
"Street Life" - Off America Is Dying Slowly (featuring Mobb Deep & ACD)
"Firm Biz" – off Nas, Foxy Brown, AZ, and Nature Present The Firm: The Album (featuring The Firm)
"Favor for a Favor" – off I Am... (featuring Nas & Scarface)
"Find Ya Wealth" off QB's Finest (featuring Nas)
"Nastradamus" – off Nastradamus (featuring Nas)
"Gettin' Jiggy Wit It" – off Big Willie Style (featuring Will Smith)
"The Flyest" – off Stillmatic (featuring Nas & AZ)
"I'm Real" – off J.Lo (featuring Jennifer Lopez)
"Just a Moment" – off Street's Disciple (featuring Nas & Quan)
"Black Republican" – off Hip Hop Is Dead (featuring Nas & Jay-Z)
"Bring It All to Me" – off Blaque (featuring Blaque & JC Chasez of 'N Sync)
"Corner Bodega" – off Power Of The Dollar (featuring 50 Cent)
"How Ya Livin'" - off Pieces of a Man (AZ album) (featuring AZ & Nas)
"The Crack Attack'" - off Don Cartagena (featuring Fat Joe)

References

External links
MySpace Page

American hip hop record producers
Living people
Year of birth missing (living people)